Arthur Dixon Elementary is a public K-8 school located in the Chatham neighborhood on the South Side of Chicago, Illinois. It is part of the Chicago Public Schools system. The school is named for Chicago alderman and businessman, Arthur Dixon. Dixon opened in 1929.

In 2012 it had 600 students; circa 2000 it had 750 students.

Curriculum
As of 2012, it hosts an extensive art gallery of over 200 pieces, including mosaics, textiles, paintings made of oil and watercolors, and sculptures, in the interior and exterior.  the school's art teacher is a career artist, and the school holds auctions in which students sell their art.

Its art program began circa 2002, and was developed by principal Joan Dameron Crisler. The art pieces have African-American themes. Between 2002 and 2012 none of its pieces have been stolen nor defaced. Sharon Dale, an assistant principal, continued the art program after Crisler received a new administrator mentoring job. School district budget cuts circa 2012 impacted the art program. The artwork and educational philosophy of Dixon Elementary were highlighted in the documentary The Curators of Dixon School.

Circa 2000 it also hosted a program sponsored by Dixon-Eagle Community Bank in which students simulate the operation of a bank to teach them financial skills. The school also had business simulation programs and had plans to open a community garden.

Academic performance and student discipline
In 2012, Chicago Public Schools ranked Dixon (which is not a magnet school) a "Level 1," meaning that it has a high level of academic performance. It achieved this rating despite not being able to choose its own students. In 2015 it was ranked "Level 1+", the top rating in CPS' School Quality Rating Policy (SQRP). The overall score is determined from student attainment and growth on the NWEA MAP test, student attendance, My Voice and My School surveys, student growth on ACCESS for English Learners, and data quality of the report. The following table shows Dixon's overall rating and accountability status on all SQRP reports since the latter's inception in 2014–15.

 the school does not have any metal detectors nor security guards.

Feeder patterns
Portions of the Dixon attendance boundary are assigned to different high schools: Harlan Community Academy High School, Hirsch Metropolitan High School.

Notes

References

External links
 Arthur Dixon Elementary School
 

Public K–8 schools in Chicago
Educational institutions established in 1929
1929 establishments in Illinois